Stibole is a theoretical heterocyclic organic compound, a five-membered ring with the formula C4H4SbH. It is classified as a metallole. It can be viewed as a structural analog of pyrrole, with antimony replacing the nitrogen atom of pyrrole. Substituted derivatives, which have been synthesized, are called stiboles.

Reactions
2,5-Dimethyl-1-phenyl-1H-stibole, for example, can be formed by the reaction of 1,1-dibutyl-2,5-dimethylstannole and dichlorophenylstibine. Stiboles can be used to form ferrocene-like sandwich compounds.

See also
Organoantimony chemistry

References

Antimony heterocycles
Metalloles
Hypothetical chemical compounds